Tadamon Beirut Sporting Club  was a football club based in Beirut, Lebanon.

History 
Founded on 15 June 1961, Tadamon Beirut have participated in the Lebanese Premier League numerous times. In 1986–87 they reached the final of the Lebanese FA Cup, losing 2–0 to Nejmeh thanks to a brace by Mahmoud Hammoud. In the 1991–92 season, Tadamon Beirut finished in first place in Group A, losing the championship play-off to Ansar 4–1 on aggregate. They last participated in the Lebanese Premier League during the 1992–93 season.

In 2006 the club was playing in the Lebanese Fourth Division. They won the Lebanese Third Division during the 2012–13 season, beating Shabiba Mazraa 2–0 after extra time in the promotion play-off. Tadamon Beirut withdrew from the Lebanese Second Division in 2014–15, and were dissolved.

Honours 
 Lebanese Third Division
 Champions (1): 2012–13

 Lebanese FA Cup
Runners-up (1): 1986–87

References 

 
Defunct football clubs in Lebanon
Football clubs in Lebanon
Association football clubs established in 1961
1961 establishments in Lebanon
2014 disestablishments in Lebanon
Association football clubs disestablished in 2014